Butterfly Conservation (BC) is a UK-wide nonprofit environmentalist organization and charity dedicated to conserving butterflies, moths, and the environment. The charity uses its research to provide advice on how to conserve and restore butterfly and moth habitats and it runs projects to protect more than 100 threatened species of Lepidoptera. Butterfly Conservation is also involved in conserving hundreds of sites and reserves for butterflies and moths throughout the UK.

Butterfly Conservation has more than 37,000 members and 31 volunteer-led Branches throughout the UK, as well as the European Butterflies Group. The organisation's Head Office is based in East Lulworth, Dorset, with additional offices in Scotland, Wales, and Northern Ireland.

History
The organisation was originally formed in 1968 as the "British Butterfly Conservation Society" by a small group of naturalists and it was registered as a charity on 7 March 1968.

Butterfly Conservation is a company limited by guarantee, registered in England (2206468). Registered Office: Manor Yard, East Lulworth, Wareham, Dorset, BH20 5QP. Charity registered in England and Wales (254937) and in Scotland (SCO39268) VAT No GB 991 2771 89.

Butterfly Conservation operates three of the world’s largest butterfly and moth recording schemes, which together have gathered more than 60 million records.

This includes the world’s largest butterfly survey - the Big Butterfly Count, launched in 2010). The citizen science survey encourages people to spot and record common butterflies and two day-flying moths during three weeks of high summer.

The charity also runs a number of moths schemes and conservation activities focusing solely on the conservation of moths that people can get involved in.

Butterfly Conservation produces three editions of its membership magazine Butterfly every year. The magazine is distributed to members, institutions, conservation bodies and others interested or involved in the conservation of butterflies, moths and related wildlife. The publication has an estimated readership of 60,000.

BC celebrated its 50th anniversary year in 2018. Sir David Attenborough became President of the society in 1998.

Function of the organisation
Butterfly Conservation is the UK charity dedicated to saving butterflies and moths.

Why butterflies and moths matter: Butterflies and moths are important parts of the ecosystem. They are beautiful and inspirational and people enjoy seeing them in their gardens and the countryside. They are sensitive to change and their fortunes help us assess the health of our environment. Two-thirds of butterfly and moth species are in decline. This is a warning that cannot be ignored.

Butterfly Conservation aims to maintain and enhance landscapes for butterflies and moths. The charity provides advice to landowners and managers on how to conserve and restore habitats. BC staff and volunteers work to gather extensive butterfly and moth data and conduct research to provide the scientific evidence that underpins and informs the charity's work.

Butterfly Conservation has an established record of reversing declines and run programmes for more than 100 threatened species of butterflies and moths.

Reserves
Butterfly Conservation manages over 30 nature reserves.

England

Scotland

 Allt Mhuic, Loch Arkaig
 Mabie Forest, Dumfries and Galloway
 Wester Moss, Stirling

Wales
 Caeau Ffos Fach, Cross Hands
 Eyarth Rocks, Ruthin, Denbighshire

Organisational structure
Sir David Attenborough has served as President of the charity since 1998.

Chief Executive Role

2017–present day: Julie Williams

2003 - 2016: Dr. Martin Warren
 
Vice Presidents: Maurice Avent, Nick Baker, John F Burton, Dudley Cheeseman, Sue Collins, The Earl of Cranbrook, David Dennis, Mike Dilger, Clive Farrell, Julian Gibbs, Ian Hardy MVO, David Hanson, Anthony Hoare, Chris Packham, Prof Jeremy Thomas OBE and Alan Titchmarsh MBE.

Prior to his death in 2004, Anthony Ashley-Cooper, 10th Earl of Shaftesbury served as a Vice president of the charity.

The organisation has over 30 volunteer-led Branches across the UK, with offices based in England, Northern Ireland, Scotland and Wales.

UK Branch offices

 Bedfordshire and Northants Branch
 Cambridgeshire and Essex Branch
 Cheshire and Wirral Branch
 Cornwall Branch
 Cumbria Branch
 Devon Branch
 Dorset Branch
 East Midlands Branch
 East Scotland Branch
 Glasgow and South West Scotland Branch
 Gloucestershire Branch
 Hampshire & Isle of Wight Branch
 Hertfordshire and Middlesex Branch
 Highlands and Islands Branch
 Kent and South East London Branch
 Lancashire Branch
 Lincolnshire Branch
 Northern Ireland Branch
 Norfolk Branch
 North East England Branch
 North Wales Branch
 South Wales Branch
 Somerset and Bristol Branch
 Suffolk Branch
 Surrey and South West London Branch
 Sussex Branch
 Upper Thames Branch
 Warwickshire Branch
 West Midlands Branch
 Wiltshire Branch
 Yorkshire Branch

The European Butterflies Group has also been established as a BC volunteer-led Branch, which promotes the study, conservation and enjoyment of butterflies, moths and their habitats in Europe. See also BC Europe.

References

External links
Butterfly Conservation
Big Butterfly Count
Butterfly Conservation on Facebook, 
Butterfly Conservation on Twitter
Butterfly Conservation on Instagram.

1968 establishments in the United Kingdom
Biology organisations based in the United Kingdom
 
Butterfly organizations
Conservation in the United Kingdom
Environmental charities based in the United Kingdom
Organisations based in Dorset
Organizations established in 1968
Purbeck District